A rescue co-ordination centre (RCC) is a primary search and rescue facility in a country that is staffed by supervisory personnel and equipped for co-ordinating and controlling search and rescue operations.

RCCs are responsible for a geographic area, known as a "search and rescue region of responsibility" (SRR).  SRRs are designated by the International Maritime Organization (IMO) and the International Civil Aviation Organization (ICAO).  RCCs are operated unilaterally by personnel of a single military service (e.g. an air force, or a navy) or a single civilian service (e.g. a national police force, or a coast guard).

Genres
A Joint Rescue Co-ordination Centre or JRCC is a special type of RCC that is operated by personnel from multiple military services, civilian services, or a combination of military and/or civilian services.

A Maritime Rescue Sub-Centre or MRSC is a special type of RCC dedicated exclusively to organising search and rescue in a maritime environment.  An MRSC usually is subservient to an RCC and is used to take the workload for a particular geographic area within the SRR.

Applications
 United States - United States Coast Guard and United States Air Force are partners in Joint Rescue Co-ordination Centres under the National Search and Rescue Plan.
 Canada - Canadian Coast Guard and Canadian Forces Search and Rescue (Royal Canadian Air Force and Royal Canadian Navy) are partners in Joint Rescue Co-ordination Centres; CCG operates Maritime Rescue Sub-Centres to offload work from JRCC

Worldwide centers

Europe
 Cyprus Joint Rescue Coordination Center, Cyprus
 Joint Rescue Coordination Centre of Southern Norway, Sola, Norway
 Joint Rescue Coordination Centre, Iceland
 Joint Rescue Center Gothenburg, Gothenburg, Sweden
 Joint Rescue Coordination Center Den Helder, Den Helder, The Netherlands
 Aeronautical Rescue Coordination Centre, Fareham, United Kingdom
 Marine Rescue Coordination Center Bremen, Germany
 Maritime Rescue and Coordination Center Rome, Italy

Africa
 South African Maritime Safety Authority

Asia
 Hong Kong Maritime Rescue Co-ordination Centre
 Sri Lanka Maritime Rescue Coordinating Centre

Oceania
 Joint Rescue Coordination Center Honolulu
 Australian Maritime Safety Authority's Joint Rescue Coordination Centre, Canberra
 Auckland Marine Rescue Centre, Auckland, New Zealand

North America
 Air Force Rescue Coordination Center (United States)
 Joint Rescue Coordination Centre Victoria, Victoria, Canada
 Joint Rescue Coordination Centre Halifax. Halifax, Canada
 Joint Rescue Coordination Centre Trenton. Astra, Canada

South America
Marine Rescue Coordination Center Chile
 MRCC Iquique
 MRCC Puerto Montt
 MRCC Punta Arenas (Cobrem Par)
 MRCC Talcahuano
 MRCC Valparaiso

External links
 Search and rescue contacts worldwide

References